OneLight Theatre is a professional theatre company, based in Halifax, Nova Scotia whose primary function is to develop and produce new plays. In addition to its artistic work, OneLight Theatre also hosts conferences related to theatre arts, participates actively in professional organizations, and mentors emerging professional artists through the Firestarter program.

OneLight Theatre's primary work is to develop and stage original theatrical productions, derived from a variety of international classic and modern source materials, through a disciplined collaborative process. In doing so, the company engages with a variety of artistic and academic professionals thereby developing an ever-widening dialogue about theatre in Canada. Through their work it strives to explore and broaden the understanding of theatre and its role in the cultural framework of Nova Scotia and Canada, and to facilitate national discussions about developments in the theatrical profession.

Structure of the organization

Structure of the Company
The structure of the organization is intended to permit the effective management of the company and its artistic projects. The OneLight staff has been working together since 1999 and consists of Artistic Director Shahin Sayadi; Managing Director Maggie Stewart; and Technical Director and Administrator Jake Dambergs.  The company engages, on a contract basis, artists, musicians, designers and publicists, as required, for projects, and also has an accountant for ongoing support with budgeting and accounting. OneLight Theatre Society has a Board of Directors, which has five member, and standing committees for recruiting and fundraising which are chaired by Board members.

Brief History

1999
 The core members of the company begin working together

2002
 OneLight Theatre Society is incorporated

2004
 PACT (affiliate member)
 Forum 2004: Theatre in Nova Scotia: Yesterday, Today, Tomorrow

2005
 Heritage Canada: CAHSP grant for Strategic Planning and Board Governance
 Forum 2005: The Canadian Theatre Identity Crisis
 Membership in Playwrights Atlantic Resource Centre (PARC)

2006
 Canada Council Extended Project Grant  (The Veil)
 PACT- full member, OneLight signs into the Canadian Theatre Agreement (CTA)
 Canada Council Capacity Building Grant / Stand Firm program
 Shahin Sayadi attends the Playwrights Workshop Montreal retreat at Tadoussac
 Firestarter program launched
 Operating support from the province

2007
 Canada Council Capacity Building Grant / Stand Firm program
 Shahin Sayadi attends Banff Playwrights Colony
 Firestarter mentoring participant, Shauntay Grant, selected and will begin work in Fall 2007

Productions
From 2002 to 2005, OneLight Theatre had its own performance space, The Crib, on Gottingen Street, and developed and presented five plays there. In 2006 the theatre moved to a downtown office space at 1590 Argyle Street. In 2005 it produced Death of Yazdgerd at the Neptune Studio Stage, and later toured this play to the Firehall Arts Centre in Vancouver.

In 2006, Onelight was one of five organizations in Canada to be granted a Canada Council for the Arts extended project grant to develop a new play. In the subsequent 18 months, Onelight along with Neptune Theatre and the Mermaid Theatre of Nova Scotia developed this new play, The Veil. The Veil was scheduled to debut at Neptune’s Studio and then tour to the Harbourfront Studio Theatre in Toronto.

1999
 The Bacchae (The Crib)

2002
 Medea (The Crib)

2003
 Woyczeck (The Crib)
 Lady MacPunch (The Crib)

2004
 Josette (The Crib)
 My Own True Love: WAR (The Crib)

2005
 Death of Yazdgerd (Neptune Studio; Firehall Arts Centre, Vancouver)

2007
 The Veil: The Story of Khanoom (Neptune Studio; Harbourfront Centre, Toronto)

External links
 http://www.onelighttheatre.com

Theatres in Nova Scotia
Theatre companies in Nova Scotia
Culture of Halifax, Nova Scotia